28P/Neujmin, also known as Neujmin 1, is a large periodic comet in the Solar System. With a perihelion distance (closest approach to the Sun) of 1.5AU, this comet does not make close approaches to the Earth.

The comet nucleus is estimated to be 21.4 kilometers in diameter with a low albedo of 0.025.  Since 28P has such a large nucleus, it will become brighter than the 20th magnitude in early 2019, roughly 2 years before coming to perihelion.  When it comes to opposition in May 2020, when it is still 3.5 AU from the Sun, it will likely have an apparent magnitude around 16.9.  But during the 2021 perihelion passage the comet will be on the opposite side of the Sun as the Earth.  The comet is not known for bright outbursts of activity.

References

External links 
 Orbital simulation from JPL (Java) / Horizons Ephemeris
 28P at Kronk's Cometography
 28P/Neujmin 1 – Seiichi Yoshida @ aerith.net

Periodic comets
0028
19130903